Al Hekma International School (AHIS) is a co-educational international school offering an American curriculum from Pre-school to High School (PS-Grade 12). The school was founded in 1985 and is accredited by the Bahraini Ministry of Education and by two accreditation organizations: Middle States Association for Accreditation of Colleges & Schools (MSA) and North Central Association (NCA) in the United States.

References

External links

Al Hekma International School Homepage

International schools in Bahrain
Schools in Bahrain
Cambridge schools in Bahrain